The Boar's Head Society (1910 – 1970s) was a student conversazione society devoted to poetry at Columbia University.  It was an "adjunct to Columbia College's Philolexian Society...  The purpose of their new society was entirely creative: reading and commenting on each other's works."

History

John Erskine, English professor, formed the society.  This connected the society through him to Columbia's student literary magazine, The Morningside Review (founded first as the Literary Monthly in 1815, renamed by Erskine in 1898, and renamed the Columbia Review in 1932).  In 1931, it claimed to be the only organization on campus "devoted exclusively to poetry."

The society seems to have started during the 1909–1910 academic schoolyear, as in November 1909 it sponsored theatrical productions of Shakespeare's Comedy of Errors and Oscar Wilde's An Ideal Husband.

Competitions
The society also held annual literary competitions and then published winners in the magazine.  Competition judges included William Carlos Williams (and Lionel Trilling).  Winners included John Berryman, Terrence McNally, John Hollander, and Allen Ginsberg.

At some point, the magazine took over the competition from the society.

Members
Student members included:
 1910s:  Lewis Mumford (president), Kenneth Burke Alfred A. Knopf, Sr., Randolph Bourne, Irwin Edman, Lloyd R. Morris, Mark Van Doren
 1920s:  Whittaker Chambers, Louis Zukofsky, Samuel Theodore Hecht, Lionel Trilling, Eleanor Bell (first woman member)
 1930s:  John Berryman, Ralph de Toledano, Barry Ulanov
 1940s:  Daniel Hoffman, John Hollander , Allen Ginsberg
 1950s:  Terrence McNally

Mentions
Mention of the Boar's Head Society appears in the Columbia Daily Spectator.  Archives record:
 "Boar's Head Well on Way" on May 12, 1910
 "New Literary Society on Campus" on October 8, 1910, for the term at University Hall
 "Boar's Head to Hold Last Meeting" on May 5, 1911, for the term at University Hall
 "Boar's Head to Hold Last Meeting" on May 8, 1911, for the term at University Hall
 "French Scholar to Address Boar's Head" on December 10, 1912
 "Dr. Van Doren to Address Boar's Head" on February 25, 1913
 "Boar's Head Meeting on Wednesday" on November 2, 1914, in Hamilton Hall
 "Boar's Head Meets Tonight" on August 10, 1915, in
 "Meeting" on September 28, 1920, in Erskine's office in Hamilton Hall
 "Boar's Head to Meet" on March 17, 1921
 "Boar's Head to Meet" on February 9, 1923
 "Boar's Head Will Meet" on December 8, 1926, with Professor Erskine
  "Anniversary Program" on April 30, 1931, with Philosophy Professor and literary critic Houston Peterson as guest of honor
 "26th Annual Poetry Reading" on April 30, 1936, presided by Professor Mark Van Doren, guest of honor R.P. Blackmur, and winner John Berryman
 "W. C. Williams To Read Poems Here Tonight" on May 6, 1937
 "Set Poetry Deadline" on April 16, 1952, for the annual competition
 "Review Produced Literary Notables" on October 14, 1959
 "Columbia Review:  Mixing Metaphors" on April 25, 1961
 "Review to Publish Volumes Featuring Individual Authors" on September 25, 1964

Impact
The April 1935 issue of the Columbia Review, Lionel Trilling wrote "Boar's Heart: 25 Years" and Mark Van Doren wrote a "Note on Poetry".

In 2006, Hoffman reminisced, "When I returned to Columbia after the Second World War, I joined the Boar's Head Society, which was a little group of poets. In those days, colleges didn't like poets to do anything, so we ponied up the hundred bucks and invited him" (W. H. Auden).

See also
 Columbia University
 John Erskine
 Mark Van Doren

References

1910 establishments in the United States
Columbia University student organizations